is a Japanese light novel written by Hiro Yūki and illustrated by Kazumi Ikeda, with art and backgrounds by Momoka Nagatani. Kyoto Animation published the novel under their KA Esuma Bunko imprint in August 2018.

Media

Light Novel
20 Seiki Denki Mokuroku is a Japanese light novel written by Hiro Yūki and illustrated by Kazumi Ikeda, with art and backgrounds by Momoka Nagatani. Kyoto Animation published the novel under their KA Esuma Bunko imprint on August 10, 2018.

Anime
On July 27, 2018, KA Esuma Bunko's Twitter account announced that an anime adaptation of the novel would be produced, and would be animated by Kyoto Animation, but the project's status is currently unknown following the Kyoto Animation arson attack which destroyed the main production office.

Reception
20 Seiki Denki Mokuroku won an honorable mention in the full-length novel category at the 8th Kyoto Animation Awards in 2017. The entry was the only one to win any of the awards available that year.

References

External links
  

2018 Japanese novels
Kyoto Animation
KA Esuma Bunko